Accursed or The Accursed may refer to:

The Accursed (Oates novel), 2013
The Accursed, a 1994 book by Robert E. Vardeman
The Accursed, a 2013 book by Antony Cutler
Thor, God of Thunder: The Accursed, a comic book by Jason Aaron

See also
List of people known as the Accursed
Cursed (disambiguation)